Timothy Holmes FRCS (9 May 1825 in Islington, Greater London – 8 September 1907) was an English surgeon, known as the editor of several editions of Gray's Anatomy.

Life
Holmes was educated at Merchant Taylors' School and then at Pembroke College, Cambridge with B.A. in 1847 and M.A. in 1850. He studied medicine at St George's Hospital. In 1853 he was made a Fellow of the Royal College of Surgeons without previously having acquired the usual diploma of M.R.C.S. At St George's Hospital he became house surgeon, surgical registrar, and in 1867 full surgeon. Also, at the Hospital for Sick Children in Great Ormond Street, Holmes was assistant surgeon from 1859 and then full surgeon from 1861 to 1868. He was also appointed Chief Surgeon of the Metropolitan Police in 1865.

In 1889 Holmes was the chairman of the Building Committee of the Royal Medical and Chirurgical Society of London; the committee was in charge of moving the Society from its old quarters in Berners Street to a house in Hanover Square. In 1890 he was elected the Society's president.

Works
Holmes wrote A Treatise on the Surgical Treatment of the Diseases of Infancy and Childhood (1868) and was the editor of the third through ninth editions of Gray's Anatomy, preceded in the editorship by Henry Gray and succeeded by T. Pickering Pick. Holmes was the co-editor of the first 8 volumes of the journal St George's Hospital Reports. With John S. Bristowe, Holmes published in 1863 a report, commissioned by the Privy Council, on the state of hospitals and their administration in the U.K. He was the editor of 4 editions of A Treatise on Surgery: Its Principles and Practice (1st edition, 1875; 2nd, 1878; 3rd, 1882; 4th, 1886). He wrote a biography of Sir Benjamin Collins Brodie published in 1898. He was a friend of the pathologist and syphilologist Henry Lee, writing his obituary in The Lancet in 1898. Holmes also created the first English translation of Lay Down Your Arms! (Die Waffen nieder!) by Bertha von Suttner in 1892. The second edition of his translation was published in 1908.

References

External links
 

1825 births
1907 deaths
British surgeons
British book editors
British medical writers
Fellows of the Royal College of Surgeons
Alumni of Pembroke College, Cambridge
People educated at Merchant Taylors' School, Northwood
Physicians of Great Ormond Street Hospital
Chief Surgeons of the Metropolitan Police